Terai Arc Landscape (TAL) is composed of 14 Indian and Nepalese trans-border protected ecosystems of the Terai (Sanskrit for "lowlands") and nearby foothills of the Himalayas. and encompassing 14 protected areas of Nepal and India. The area spans approximately 12.3 million acres (5 million hectares) and includes Nepal's Bagmati River to the east and India's Yamuna River to the west.
The TAL is home to many endangered mammals including the Bengal tiger (of which it has one of the world's highest densities), the Indian rhinoceros, the gaur, the wild Asian elephant, the hispid hare, the sloth bear, the South Asian river dolphin and the chital, as well as over 500 species of birds, many endangered. Examples of birds are the endangered Bengal florican, the sarus crane, and the black stork.

The rivers and wetlands of the TAL are rich and diverse ecosystems with many endemic species that support, besides birds and mammals, a wide range of fish, amphibians, and fresh water crustaceans.

However, the area faces many challenges to the wildlife. Of the 14 protected areas within the TAL, none is large enough, by itself, to sustain a population of tigers over time. If the protected areas were to be linked by wildlife corridors,  individual tigers would be able to move from area to area, furthering its ability to survive long-term.

TAL is densely populated and its welfare is of critical importance to its human and animal life. Its approximately three million people are among the world's poorest (50% live below the poverty live) and generally subsist on the land.

As of the beginning of 2013, the Indian government will give a donation to farmers who grow flowers in the Terai.

Protected areas within the Terai Arc Landscape 
The following are protected areas within the boundaries of the TAL:
Parsa National Park, Nepal
Chitwan National Park, Nepal
Banke National Park, Nepal
Bardia National Park, Nepal
Blackbuck Conservation Area, Nepal
Shuklaphanta Wildlife Reserve, Nepal
Valmiki National Park, India
Sohelwa Wildlife Sanctuary, India
Katarniaghat Wildlife Sanctuary, India
Dudhwa National Park, India
Kishanpur Wildlife Sanctuary, India
Corbett National Park, India
Rajaji National Park, India
Pilibhit Tiger Reserve, India

References 

Protected areas of Nepal
Protected areas of India